The 1992 Montreal Expos season was the 24th season in franchise history. They finished the season with a 87-75 record, good for second place in the National League East, 9 games behind the Pittsburgh Pirates.

Offseason
 November 15, 1991: Gary Carter was selected off waivers by the Expos from the Los Angeles Dodgers. 
 November 18, 1991: Kenny Williams was released by the Expos.
 November 25, 1991: Andrés Galarraga was traded by the Expos to the St. Louis Cardinals for Ken Hill.
 December 10, 1991: Sergio Valdez was signed as a free agent by the Expos.
 January 10, 1992: Scott Service was signed as a free agent by the Expos.
 February 12, 1992: Rick Cerone was signed as a free agent by the Expos.

Spring training
The Expos held spring training at West Palm Beach Municipal Stadium in West Palm Beach, Florida – a facility they shared with the Atlanta Braves. It was their 16th season at the stadium; they had conducted spring training there from 1969 to 1972 and since 1981.

Regular season

Season standings

Record vs. opponents

Opening Day starters
Iván Calderón
Gary Carter
Archi Cianfrocco
Delino DeShields
Mark Gardner
Marquis Grissom
Spike Owen
Larry Walker
Tim Wallach

Notable transactions
 May 8, 1992: Steve Lyons was signed as a free agent by the Expos.
 June 1, 1992: José Vidro was drafted by the Expos in the 6th round of the 1992 Major League Baseball draft. Player signed June 2, 1992.
 June 27, 1992: Steve Lyons was purchased from the Expos by the Boston Red Sox.
 July 15, 1992: Jerry Willard was signed as a free agent by the Expos.
 July 16, 1992: Rick Cerone was released by the Expos.

Roster

Game log

|- align="center" bgcolor="ffbbbb"
| 1 || April 6 || @ Pirates || 2–0 || Drabek (1–0) || Martínez (0–1) || Mason (1) || 48,800 || 0–1
|- align="center" bgcolor="ffbbbb"
| 2 || April 8 || @ Pirates || 4–2 || Smith (1–0) || Gardner (0–1) || Belinda (1) || 7,075 || 0–2
|- align="center" bgcolor="bbffbb"
| 3 || April 9 || @ Pirates || 8–3 || Nabholz (1–0) || Walk (0–1) || || 10,342 || 1–2
|- align="center" bgcolor="bbffbb"
| 4 || April 10 || @ Mets || 4–0 || Hill (1–0) || Gooden (0–1) || || 47,218 || 2–2
|- align="center" bgcolor="bbffbb"
| 5 || April 11 || @ Mets || 9–2 || Martínez (1–1) || Cone (0–1) || || 22,967 || 3–2
|- align="center" bgcolor="bbffbb"
| 6 || April 12 || @ Mets || 8–2 || C. Haney (1–0) || Saberhagen (0–2) || || 21,636 || 4–2
|- align="center" bgcolor="bbffbb"
| 7 || April 13 || Cardinals || 3–2 || Gardner (1–1) || Cormier (0–1) || Wetteland (1) || 40,907 || 5–2
|- align="center" bgcolor="ffbbbb"
| 8 || April 14 || Cardinals || 3–1 || Osborne (1–0) || Nabholz (1–1) || L. Smith (2) || 12,874 || 5–3
|- align="center" bgcolor="ffbbbb"
| 9 || April 15 || Cardinals || 4–2 || Tewksbury (1–0) || Hill (1–1) || L. Smith (3) || 10,095 || 5–4
|- align="center" bgcolor="ffbbbb"
| 10 || April 17 || Mets || 10–2 || Cone (1–1) || Martínez (1–2) || || 22,406 || 5–5
|- align="center" bgcolor="bbffbb"
| 11 || April 18 || Mets || 8–6 || Landrum (1–0) || Innis (1–1) || Wetteland (2) || 14,847 || 6–5
|- align="center" bgcolor="ffbbbb"
| 12 || April 19 || Mets || 11–6 || Young (2–0) || Fassero (0–1) || || 13,739 || 6–6
|- align="center" bgcolor="ffbbbb"
| 13 || April 20 || Pirates || 11–1 || Tomlin (3–0) || Hill (1–2) || || 12,351 || 6–7
|- align="center" bgcolor="ffbbbb"
| 14 || April 21 || Pirates || 8–7 || Palacios (1–0) || C. Haney (1–1) || Mason (3) || 7,013 || 6–8
|- align="center" bgcolor="ffbbbb"
| 15 || April 22 || Pirates || 2–0 || Drabek (3–1) || Martínez (1–3) || || 8,421 || 6–9
|- align="center" bgcolor="bbffbb"
| 16 || April 23 || Pirates || 6–3 || Gardner (2–1) || Smith (3–1) || Wetteland (3) || 5,806 || 7–9
|- align="center" bgcolor="ffbbbb"
| 17 || April 24 || @ Cardinals || 4–3 || Olivares (2–2) || Wetteland (0–1) || || 23,187 || 7–10
|- align="center" bgcolor="ffbbbb"
| 18 || April 25 || @ Cardinals || 2 – 1 (17) || Tewksbury (2–0) || Rojas (0–1) || || 24,849 || 7–11
|- align="center" bgcolor="bbffbb"
| 19 || April 26 || @ Cardinals || 6–0 || C. Haney (2–1) || Cormier (0–3) || || 25,622 || 8–11
|- align="center" bgcolor="ffbbbb"
| 20 || April 27 || @ Giants || 2–1 || Burba (1–2) || Martínez (1–4) || Brantley (1) || 8,044 || 8–12
|- align="center" bgcolor="ffbbbb"
| 21 || April 28 || @ Giants || 2 – 1 (10) || Brantley (1–0) || Sampen (0–1) || || 8,144 || 8–13
|- align="center" bgcolor="ffbbbb"
| 22 || April 29 || @ Padres || 7–2 || Greg Harris (1–1) || Nabholz (1–2) || || 9,704 || 8–14
|- align="center" bgcolor="bbffbb"
| 23 || April 30 || @ Padres || 9–3 || Hill (2–2) || Benes (2–2) || || 31,139 || 9–14
|-

|- align="center" bgcolor="bbffbb"
| 24 || May 5 || Padres || 5–2 || Martínez (2–4) || Greg Harris (1–2) || || 6,555 || 10–14
|- align="center" bgcolor="bbffbb"
| 25 || May 6 || Padres || 4–3 || Hill (3–2) || Benes (2–3) || Wetteland (4) || 7,984 || 11–14
|- align="center" bgcolor="ffbbbb"
| 26 || May 8 || Giants || 6–3 || Wilson (2–2) || Fassero (0–2) || Brantley (2) || 13,281 || 11–15
|- align="center" bgcolor="bbffbb"
| 27 || May 9 || Giants || 9–3 || Nabholz (2–2) || Black (0–1) || || 9,403 || 12–15
|- align="center" bgcolor="ffbbbb"
| 28 || May 10 || Giants || 8 – 3 (11) || Brantley (2–0) || Landrum (1–1) || || 11,275 || 12–16
|- align="center" bgcolor="bbffbb"
| 29 || May 11 || Dodgers || 6 – 5 (10) || Fassero (1–2) || Wilson (0–3) || || 7,075 || 13–16
|- align="center" bgcolor="ffbbbb"
| 30 || May 12 || Dodgers || 2–0 || Kevin Gross (1–3) || C. Haney (2–2) || || 10,170 || 13–17
|- align="center" bgcolor="bbffbb"
| 31 || May 13 || Dodgers || 5–1 || Gardner (3–1) || Hershiser (2–3) || Wetteland (5) || 17,562 || 14–17
|- align="center" bgcolor="ffbbbb"
| 32 || May 15 || @ Braves || 4–2 || Mercker (1–0) || Nabholz (2–3) || Stanton (3) || 37,551 || 14–18
|- align="center" bgcolor="bbffbb"
| 33 || May 16 || @ Braves || 7–1 || Martínez (3–4) || Avery (1–4) || Rojas (1) || 40,504 || 15–18
|- align="center" bgcolor="bbffbb"
| 34 || May 17 || @ Braves || 5–4 || Hill (4–2) || Glavine (6–2) || Wetteland (6) || 41,480 || 16–18
|- align="center" bgcolor="ffbbbb"
| 35 || May 18 || Reds || 2–1 || Bankhead (4–1) || Gardner (3–2) || Charlton (9) || 13,470 || 16–19
|- align="center" bgcolor="ffbbbb"
| 36 || May 19 || Reds || 7–4 || Henry (1–1) || Wetteland (0–2) || Dibble (6) || 8,760 || 16–20
|- align="center" bgcolor="bbffbb"
| 37 || May 20 || Reds || 6–5 || Rojas (1–1) || Dibble (0–2) || || 9,651 || 17–20
|- align="center" bgcolor="bbffbb"
| 38 || May 22 || Braves || 7–1 || Martínez (4–4) || Glavine (6–3) || || 20,313 || 18–20
|- align="center" bgcolor="bbffbb"
| 39 || May 23 || Braves || 7–6 || Fassero (2–2) || Stanton (0–2) || Wetteland (7) || 15,918 || 19–20
|- align="center" bgcolor="ffbbbb"
| 40 || May 24 || Braves || 2–1 || Smoltz (4–4) || Gardner (3–3) || || 27,682 || 19–21
|- align="center" bgcolor="ffbbbb"
| 41 || May 25 || Astros || 10–8 || Henry (1–4) || C. Haney (2–3) || D. Jones (10) || 5,765 || 19–22
|- align="center" bgcolor="ffbbbb"
| 42 || May 26 || Astros || 9–4 || Boever (1–1) || Nabholz (2–4) || D. Jones (11) || 10,093 || 19–23
|- align="center" bgcolor="bbffbb"
| 43 || May 27 || Astros || 8–5 || Martínez (5–4) || Portugal (4–2) || Wetteland (8) || 10,110 || 20–23
|- align="center" bgcolor="ffbbbb"
| 44 || May 29 || @ Reds || 3 – 2 (11) || Bankhead (5–1) || Sampen (0–2) || || 12,704 || 20–24
|- align="center" bgcolor="ffbbbb"
| 45 || May 30 || @ Reds || 9–4 || Browning (4–3) || Gardner (3–4) || || 27,226 || 20–25
|- align="center" bgcolor="bbffbb"
| 46 || May 31 || @ Reds || 6–2 || Nabholz (3–4) || Rijo (1–4) || || 29,954 || 21–25
|-

|- align="center" bgcolor="bbffbb"
| 47 || June 1 || @ Astros || 7–1 || Martínez (6–4) || Kile (2–6) || || 7,544 || 22–25
|- align="center" bgcolor="ffbbbb"
| 48 || June 2 || @ Astros || 6–0 || Portugal (5–2) || Sampen (0–3) || || 8,238 || 22–26
|- align="center" bgcolor="ffbbbb"
| 49 || June 3 || @ Astros || 5–3 || Harnisch (3–5) || Hill (4–3) || D. Jones (13) || 8,239 || 22–27
|- align="center" bgcolor="ffbbbb"
| 50 || June 5 || Cubs || 10–4 || Jackson (1–7) || Gardner (3–5) || Scanlan (2) || || 22–28
|- align="center" bgcolor="bbffbb"
| 51 || June 5 || Cubs || 6–2 || Nabholz (4–4) || Maddux (5–6) || Wetteland (9) || 20,244 || 23–28
|- align="center" bgcolor="bbffbb"
| 52 || June 7 || Cubs || 3–2 || Fassero (3–2) || Scanlan (1–2) || || 26,511 || 24–28
|- align="center" bgcolor="bbffbb"
| 53 || June 8 || Mets || 6–0 || Hill (5–3) || Young (2–4) || || 11,132 || 25–28
|- align="center" bgcolor="ffbbbb"
| 54 || June 9 || Mets || 6–5 || Franco (4–0) || Fassero (3–3) || || 12,581 || 25–29
|- align="center" bgcolor="bbffbb"
| 55 || June 10 || Mets || 8–2 || Gardner (4–5) || Cone (5–4) || || 11,839 || 26–29
|- align="center" bgcolor="ffbbbb"
| 56 || June 12 || @ Cubs || 5–2 || McElroy (3–3) || Martínez (6–5) || Bullinger (3) || 33,483 || 26–30
|- align="center" bgcolor="ffbbbb"
| 57 || June 13 || @ Cubs || 4–3 || Castillo (5–5) || Nabholz (4–5) || Bullinger (4) || 32,857 || 26–31
|- align="center" bgcolor="ffbbbb"
| 58 || June 14 || @ Cubs || 5–1 || Jackson (2–7) || Hill (5–4) || || 31,367 || 26–32
|- align="center" bgcolor="bbffbb"
| 59 || June 15 || @ Mets || 4–1 || Gardner (5–5) || Young (2–5) || Wetteland (10) || 18,733 || 27–32
|- align="center" bgcolor="ffbbbb"
| 60 || June 16 || @ Mets || 5–2 || Cone (6–4) || Hurst (0–1) || || 18,880 || 27–33
|- align="center" bgcolor="bbffbb"
| 61 || June 17 || @ Mets || 5–2 || Martínez (7–5) || Fernandez (5–7) || Rojas (2) || 20,269 || 28–33
|- align="center" bgcolor="bbffbb"
| 62 || June 18 || @ Pirates || 4–0 || Nabholz (5–5) || Palacios (3–2) || Fassero (1) || 20,512 || 29–33
|- align="center" bgcolor="bbffbb"
| 63 || June 19 || @ Pirates || 2–1 || Hill (6–4) || Drabek (5–5) || Wetteland (11) || 22,091 || 30–33
|- align="center" bgcolor="bbffbb"
| 64 || June 20 || @ Pirates || 4–3 || Gardner (6–5) || Smith (5–6) || Wetteland (12) || 31,614 || 31–33
|- align="center" bgcolor="ffbbbb"
| 65 || June 21 || @ Pirates || 5–4 || Robinson (2–0) || Martínez (7–6) || Belinda (10) || 20,138 || 31–34
|- align="center" bgcolor="ffbbbb"
| 66 || June 22 || Phillies || 5–3 || Combs (1–0) || Barnes (0–1) || Mitch Williams (15) || 15,157 || 31–35
|- align="center" bgcolor="ffbbbb"
| 67 || June 23 || Phillies || 5–0 || Schilling (6–4) || Nabholz (5–6) || || 30,313 || 31–36
|- align="center" bgcolor="bbffbb"
| 68 || June 24 || Phillies || 8–1 || Hill (7–4) || Weston (0–1) || || 17,422 || 32–36
|- align="center" bgcolor="bbffbb"
| 69 || June 25 || Pirates || 6–2 || Martínez (8–6) || Smith (5–7) || Rojas (3) || 23,014 || 33–36
|- align="center" bgcolor="ffbbbb"
| 70 || June 26 || Pirates || 12–4 || Robinson (3–0) || Gardner (6–6) || Belinda (11) || 20,146 || 33–37
|- align="center" bgcolor="bbffbb"
| 71 || June 27 || Pirates || 9–0 || Barnes (1–1) || Tomlin (10–4) || || 24,793 || 34–37
|- align="center" bgcolor="ffbbbb"
| 72 || June 29 || @ Phillies || 5–4 || Mulholland (8–4) || Fassero (3–4) || Mitch Williams (17) || 27,426 || 34–38
|- align="center" bgcolor="bbffbb"
| 73 || June 30 || @ Phillies || 7–2 || Hill (8–4) || Mike Williams (0–1) || || 22,282 || 35–38
|-

|- align="center" bgcolor="bbffbb"
| 74 || July 1 || @ Phillies || 6–3 || Martínez (9–6) || Abbott (0–10) || Wetteland (13) || 41,222 || 36–38
|- align="center" bgcolor="bbffbb"
| 75 || July 2 || @ Padres || 3–2 || Gardner (7–6) || Benes (6–6) || Wetteland (14) || 13,859 || 37–38
|- align="center" bgcolor="ffbbbb"
| 76 || July 3 || @ Padres || 6–4 || Seminara (4–2) || Barnes (1–2) || Andersen (1) || 24,476 || 37–39
|- align="center" bgcolor="bbffbb"
| 77 || July 4 || @ Padres || 3 – 2 (10) || Wetteland (1–2) || Meléndez (5–6) || Rojas (4) || 29,304 || 38–39
|- align="center" bgcolor="bbffbb"
| 78 || July 5 || @ Padres || 4 – 3 (10) || Rojas (2–1) || Scott (1–1) || || 18,840 || 39–39
|- align="center" bgcolor="ffbbbb"
| 79 || July 6 || @ Dodgers || 8–3 || Kip Gross (1–0) || Martínez (9–7) || || || 39–40
|- align="center" bgcolor="ffbbbb"
| 80 || July 6 || @ Dodgers || 4–3 || Hershiser (7–6) || Fassero (3–5) || Gott (3) || 34,169 || 39–41
|- align="center" bgcolor="bbffbb"
| 81 || July 7 || @ Dodgers || 4–1 || Gardner (8–6) || Kevin Gross (4–9) || Wetteland (15) || || 40–41
|- align="center" bgcolor="bbffbb"
| 82 || July 7 || @ Dodgers || 4–0 || Hurst (1–1) || Crews (0–1) || Wetteland (16) || 26,511 || 41–41
|- align="center" bgcolor="ffbbbb"
| 83 || July 8 || @ Dodgers || 1 – 0 (11) || Candiotti (7–7) || Valdez (0–1) || || || 41–42
|- align="center" bgcolor="bbffbb"
| 84 || July 8 || @ Dodgers || 4–1 || Risley (1–0) || Astacio (1–1) || Rojas (5) || 27,601 || 42–42
|- align="center" bgcolor="bbffbb"
| 85 || July 9 || @ Giants || 6 – 5 (12) || Wetteland (2–2) || Righetti (1–6) || || 10,299 || 43–42
|- align="center" bgcolor="bbffbb"
| 86 || July 10 || @ Giants || 3–2 || Hill (9–4) || Wilson (6–9) || Rojas (6) || 12,007 || 44–42
|- align="center" bgcolor="ffbbbb"
| 87 || July 11 || @ Giants || 3–0 || Black (7–2) || Martínez (9–8) || || 23,631 || 44–43
|- align="center" bgcolor="ffbbbb"
| 88 || July 12 || @ Giants || 4–0 || Swift (7–1) || Gardner (8–7) || || 18,597 || 44–44
|- align="center" bgcolor="bbffbb"
| 89 || July 16 || Padres || 7–4 || Hill (7–4) || Hurst (8–6) || Wetteland (17) || 30,790 || 45–44
|- align="center" bgcolor="bbffbb"
| 90 || July 17 || Padres || 3–0 || Nabholz (6–6) || Benes (7–8) || Wetteland (18) || 31,123 || 46–44
|- align="center" bgcolor="ffbbbb"
| 91 || July 18 || Padres || 10–3 || Seminara (5–2) || Martínez (9–9) || || 32,370 || 46–45
|- align="center" bgcolor="ffbbbb"
| 92 || July 19 || Padres || 9–2 || Lefferts (11–6) || Gardner (8–8) || || 25,821 || 46–46
|- align="center" bgcolor="bbffbb"
| 93 || July 20 || Giants || 2–1 || Barnes (2–2) || Rapp (0–1) || Wetteland (19) || 17,315 || 47–46
|- align="center" bgcolor="bbffbb"
| 94 || July 21 || Giants || 5–1 || Hill (11–4) || Black (8–3) || Rojas (7) || 25,719 || 48–46
|- align="center" bgcolor="ffbbbb"
| 95 || July 22 || Giants || 4–1 || Swift (8–2) || Nabholz (6–7) || || 26,822 || 48–47
|- align="center" bgcolor="bbffbb"
| 96 || July 24 || Dodgers || 4–3 || Martínez (10–9) || R. Martínez (5–8) || Wetteland (20) || 25,180 || 49–47
|- align="center" bgcolor="bbffbb"
| 97 || July 25 || Dodgers || 4–1 || Gardner (9–8) || Ojeda (5–5) || Wetteland (21) || 41,935 || 50–47
|- align="center" bgcolor="bbffbb"
| 98 || July 26 || Dodgers || 4–3 || Rojas (3–1) || Wilson (2–5) || || 46,620 || 51–47
|- align="center" bgcolor="bbffbb"
| 99 || July 27 || @ Cardinals || 6–4 || Hill (12–4) || Olivares (6–6) || Wetteland (22) || 24,863 || 52–47
|- align="center" bgcolor="bbffbb"
| 100 || July 28 || @ Cardinals || 7–4 || Fassero (4–5) || Osborne (7–6) || || 24,330 || 53–47
|- align="center" bgcolor="ffbbbb"
| 101 || July 29 || @ Cardinals || 4–1 || L. Smith (3–3) || Martínez (10–10) || || 28,495 || 53–48
|- align="center" bgcolor="bbffbb"
| 102 || July 30 || Phillies || 7–2 || Gardner (10–8) || Mathews (0–1) || || 28,106 || 54–48
|- align="center" bgcolor="ffbbbb"
| 103 || July 31 || Phillies || 2–0 || Mulholland (11–7) || Barnes (2–3) || || 30,470 || 54–49
|-

|- align="center" bgcolor="ffbbbb"
| 104 || August 1 || Phillies || 4–2 || Schilling (10–6) || Hill (12–5) || Mitch Williams (20) || 30,511 || 54–50
|- align="center" bgcolor="bbffbb"
| 105 || August 2 || Phillies || 1–0 || Nabholz (7–7) || Rivera (0–2) || Wetteland (23) || 28,645 || 55–50
|- align="center" bgcolor="bbffbb"
| 106 || August 3 || Cubs || 3–2 || Martínez (11–10) || Castillo (6–8) || Wetteland (24) || 24,338 || 56–50
|- align="center" bgcolor="ffbbbb"
| 107 || August 4 || Cubs || 8–6 || McElroy (4–6) || Sampen (0–4) || Assenmacher (6) || 31,704 || 56–51
|- align="center" bgcolor="bbffbb"
| 108 || August 5 || Cubs || 5–3 || Barnes (3–3) || Patterson (1–2) || Wetteland (25) || 23,617 || 57–51
|- align="center" bgcolor="bbffbb"
| 109 || August 6 || @ Phillies || 7–4 || Hill (13–5) || Schilling (10–7) || Wetteland (26) || 18,848 || 58–51
|- align="center" bgcolor="ffbbbb"
| 110 || August 7 || @ Phillies || 3–1 || Rivera (1–2) || Nabholz (7–8) || Mitch Williams (21) || 22,673 || 58–52
|- align="center" bgcolor="bbffbb"
| 111 || August 8 || @ Phillies || 6–1 || Martínez (12–10) || Abbott (1–13) || || 26,338 || 59–52
|- align="center" bgcolor="bbffbb"
| 112 || August 9 || @ Phillies || 6–2 || Gardner (11–8) || Mathews (0–2) || Rojas (8) || 25,683 || 60–52
|- align="center" bgcolor="bbffbb"
| 113 || August 10 || @ Cubs || 11–0 || Barnes (4–3) || Robinson (2–1) || || 32,911 || 61–52
|- align="center" bgcolor="bbffbb"
| 114 || August 11 || @ Cubs || 3 – 2 (17) || Sampen (1–4) || Robinson (2–2) || || 31,528 || 62–52
|- align="center" bgcolor="bbffbb"
| 115 || August 12 || @ Cubs || 3–1 || Nabholz (8–8) || Morgan (10–6) || Rojas (9) || 29,984 || 63–52
|- align="center" bgcolor="bbffbb"
| 116 || August 14 || Cardinals || 4–1 || Martínez (13–10) || Cormier (3–10) || Wetteland (27) || 36,343 || 64–52
|- align="center" bgcolor="ffbbbb"
| 117 || August 15 || Cardinals || 6–4 || Tewksbury (12–5) || Wetteland (2–3) || L. Smith (29) || 31,185 || 64–53
|- align="center" bgcolor="ffbbbb"
| 118 || August 16 || Cardinals || 5–2 || Osborne (9–6) || Barnes (4–4) || L. Smith (30) || 36,405 || 64–54
|- align="center" bgcolor="ffbbbb"
| 119 || August 18 || Braves || 5–1 || Leibrandt (10–4) || Hill (13–6) || || 32,920 || 64–55
|- align="center" bgcolor="ffbbbb"
| 120 || August 19 || Braves || 4–2 || Glavine (19–3) || Nabholz (8–9) || Stanton (6) || 27,235 || 64–56
|- align="center" bgcolor="bbffbb"
| 121 || August 20 || Braves || 3–2 || Fassero (5–5) || Peña (1–6) || || 23,896 || 65–56
|- align="center" bgcolor="bbffbb"
| 122 || August 21 || Reds || 6–3 || Wetteland (3–3) || Belcher (10–12) || || 24,900 || 66–56
|- align="center" bgcolor="bbffbb"
| 123 || August 22 || Reds || 3–1 || Rojas (4–1) || Swindell (12–6) || Wetteland (28) || 38,200 || 67–56
|- align="center" bgcolor="ffbbbb"
| 124 || August 23 || Reds || 1–0 || Rijo (10–9) || Hill (13–7) || Dibble (16) || 34,998 || 67–57
|- align="center" bgcolor="bbffbb"
| 125 || August 25 || @ Braves || 6–0 || Nabholz (9–9) || Glavine (19–4) || || 38,455 || 68–57
|- align="center" bgcolor="bbffbb"
| 126 || August 26 || @ Braves || 5–4 || Martínez (14–10) || Avery (10–9) || Wetteland (29) || 36,275 || 69–57
|- align="center" bgcolor="ffbbbb"
| 127 || August 28 || @ Astros || 8–1 || Harnisch (5–9) || Gardner (11–9) || || 10,629 || 69–58
|- align="center" bgcolor="ffbbbb"
| 128 || August 29 || @ Astros || 8–2 || J. Jones (8–5) || Barnes (4–5) || || 16,657 || 69–59
|- align="center" bgcolor="bbffbb"
| 129 || August 30 || @ Astros || 4–0 || Hill (14–7) || Kile (2–9) || || 14,939 || 70–59
|- align="center" bgcolor="bbffbb"
| 130 || August 31 || @ Reds || 8–4 || Rojas (5–1) || Bolton (2–3) || || 17,388 || 71–59
|-

|- align="center" bgcolor="bbffbb"
| 131 || September 1 || @ Reds || 5–2 || Martínez (15–10) || Pugh (0–1) || Wetteland (30) || 18,204 || 72–59
|- align="center" bgcolor="bbffbb"
| 132 || September 2 || @ Reds || 7–3 || Fassero (6–5) || Charlton (3–2) || Wetteland (31) || 14,382 || 73–59
|- align="center" bgcolor="bbffbb"
| 133 || September 3 || @ Braves || 11–2 || Barnes (5–5) || Leibrandt (11–6) || Bottenfield (1) || 27,824 || 74–59
|- align="center" bgcolor="bbffbb"
| 134 || September 4 || Astros || 5–2 || Hill (15–7) || J. Jones (8–6) || Wetteland (32) || 25,357 || 75–59
|- align="center" bgcolor="ffbbbb"
| 135 || September 5 || Astros || 5–2 || Kile (3–9) || Nabholz (9–10) || || 28,143 || 75–60
|- align="center" bgcolor="ffbbbb"
| 136 || September 6 || Astros || 3–1 || Henry (6–9) || Martínez (15–11) || D. Jones (31) || 33,311 || 75–61
|- align="center" bgcolor="ffbbbb"
| 137 || September 7 || Cardinals || 8 – 7 (10) || B. Smith (1–0) || Wetteland (3–4) || L. Smith (38) || 21,933 || 75–62
|- align="center" bgcolor="bbffbb"
| 138 || September 8 || Cardinals || 6–1 || Barnes (6–5) || Clark (3–9) || Rojas (10) || 13,704 || 76–62
|- align="center" bgcolor="ffbbbb"
| 139 || September 9 || Cardinals || 10–3 || Magrane (1–0) || Hill (15–8) || || 16,068 || 76–63
|- align="center" bgcolor="bbffbb"
| 140 || September 11 || Mets || 4–3 || Fassero (7–5) || Saberhagen (3–4) || Wetteland (33) || 21,252 || 77–63
|- align="center" bgcolor="bbffbb"
| 141 || September 12 || Mets || 4–1 || Martínez (16–11) || Schourek (5–7) || || 30,691 || 78–63
|- align="center" bgcolor="bbffbb"
| 142 || September 13 || Mets || 7–5 || Rojas (6–1) || Young (2–12) || || 15,492 || 79–63
|- align="center" bgcolor="ffbbbb"
| 143 || September 14 || @ Phillies || 6–2 || Greene (3–1) || Barnes (6–6) || Shepherd (1) || 12,130 || 79–64
|- align="center" bgcolor="bbffbb"
| 144 || September 15 || @ Phillies || 3–0 || Hill (16–8) || Schilling (13–10) || Wetteland (34) || 13,799 || 80–64
|- align="center" bgcolor="bbffbb"
| 145 || September 16 || @ Pirates || 6–3 || Nabholz (10–10) || Walk (9–6) || Wetteland (35) || 37,436 || 81–64
|- align="center" bgcolor="ffbbbb"
| 146 || September 17 || @ Pirates || 3 – 2 (13) || Cox (5–3) || Bottenfield (0–1) || || 20,802 || 81–65
|- align="center" bgcolor="bbffbb"
| 147 || September 18 || @ Mets || 10–4 || Gardner (12–9) || Gooden (8–13) || || 16,856 || 82–65
|- align="center" bgcolor="ffbbbb"
| 148 || September 19 || @ Mets || 7–5 || Whitehurst (3–8) || Fassero (7–6) || || 21,501 || 82–66
|- align="center" bgcolor="ffbbbb"
| 149 || September 20 || @ Mets || 1–0 || Fernandez (13–10) || Hill (16–9) || || 22,257 || 82–67
|- align="center" bgcolor="ffbbbb"
| 150 || September 21 || Phillies || 9–2 || Rivera (6–4) || Nabholz (10–11) || || 11,596 || 82–68
|- align="center" bgcolor="ffbbbb"
| 151 || September 22 || Phillies || 5–2 || Hartley (6–6) || Bottenfield (0–2) || Mitch Williams (26) || 11,196 || 82–69
|- align="center" bgcolor="bbffbb"
| 152 || September 23 || Pirates || 5 – 1 (14) || Fassero (8–6) || Mason (5–7) || || 30,552 || 83–69
|- align="center" bgcolor="ffbbbb"
| 153 || September 24 || Pirates || 9–3 || Drabek (15–10) || Krueger (0–1) || || 33,493 || 83–70
|- align="center" bgcolor="bbffbb"
| 154 || September 25 || Cubs || 4 – 3 (10) || Wetteland (4–4) || Slocumb (0–3) || || 16,873 || 84–70
|- align="center" bgcolor="bbffbb"
| 155 || September 26 || Cubs || 12–0 || Nabholz (11–11) || Boskie (5–11) || || 26,257 || 85–70
|- align="center" bgcolor="bbffbb"
| 156 || September 27 || Cubs || 1–0 || Rojas (7–1) || Morgan (15–8) || Wetteland (36) || 41,802 || 86–70
|- align="center" bgcolor="ffbbbb"
| 157 || September 28 || @ Cardinals || 4–1 || Olivares (9–9) || Krueger (0–2) || L. Smith (41) || 12,713 || 86–71
|- align="center" bgcolor="ffbbbb"
| 158 || September 29 || @ Cardinals || 2 – 1 (10) || Pérez (9–3) || Valdez (0–2) || || 13,434 || 86–72
|- align="center" bgcolor="ffbbbb"
| 159 || September 30 || @ Cardinals || 3 – 2 (11) || B. Smith (4–2) || Fassero (8–7) || || 13,627 || 86–73
|-

|- align="center" bgcolor="ffbbbb"
| 160 || October 2 || @ Cubs || 3–1 || Morgan (16–8) || Nabholz (11–12) || || 15,719 || 86–74
|- align="center" bgcolor="bbffbb"
| 161 || October 3 || @ Cubs || 3–1 || Bottenfield (1–2) || Bullinger (2–8) || Wetteland (37) || 25,290 || 87–74
|- align="center" bgcolor="ffbbbb"
| 162 || October 4 || @ Cubs || 3–2 || Castillo (10–11) || Gardner (12–10) || Assenmacher (8) || 23,496 || 87–75
|-

Player stats

Batting

Starters by position 
Note: Pos = Position; G = Games played; AB = At bats; H = Hits; Avg. = Batting average; HR = Home runs; RBI = Runs batted in

Other batters 
Note: G = Games played; AB = At bats; H = Hits; Avg. = Batting average; HR = Home runs; RBI = Runs batted in

Pitching

Starting pitchers 
Note: G = Games pitched; IP = Innings pitched; W = Wins; L = Losses; ERA = Earned run average; SO = Strikeouts

Other pitchers 
Note: G = Games pitched; IP = Innings pitched; W = Wins; L = Losses; ERA = Earned run average; SO = Strikeouts

Relief pitchers 
Note: G = Games pitched; W = Wins; L = Losses; SV = Saves; ERA = Earned run average; SO = Strikeouts

Awards and honors

National League leaders 
Offensive statistics
 At bats: Marquis Grissom (653)
 Outs made: Marquis Grissom (505)
 Stolen bases: Marquis Grissom (78)

Defensive statistics
 Assists as right fielder: Larry Walker (16)

All-Star Game
 Played at Jack Murphy Stadium in San Diego, California
 Selections
 Larry Walker (1st)
 Home Run Derby participant: Larry Walker

Awards

 Montreal Expos Player of the Year: Larry Walker
 National League Most Valuable Player Award (MVP) voting results: Walker (5th), Grissom (9th), Delino DeShields (16th)
 Rawlings Gold Glove Award: Larry Walker (outfield)
 Silver Slugger Award: Larry Walker (outfield)

Farm system

References

External links
 1992 Montreal Expos at Baseball Reference
 1992 Montreal Expos at Baseball Almanac

Montreal Expos seasons
Montreal Expos season
1990s in Montreal
1992 in Quebec